

Introduction 
The Ministry of Justice of Morocco is responsible for ensuring the proper functioning of the judicial system. In addition to managing the prisons, the ministry holds authority over the central administration that includes the following departments: 

 the general secretariat of the ministry, headed by the general secretary:
 the Directorate of Civil Affairs;
 the Directorate of Criminal Affairs and Pardons ;
 the Human Resources Directorate;
 the Directorate of Legislation;
 the Directorate of Budget and Control;
 the Directorate of Equipment.

The minister is specifically responsible for the following:

 the minister's office;
 the office of the cabinet, which includes staff responsible for the administrative and logistical management of the cabinet;
 the general inspection;
 the service of the follow-up and the analysis of the requests.

List of ministers (1956 Independence-present) 

Abdelkrim Benjelloun Touimi (1955-1958)
Mohamed Bahnini (1958-1961)
Abdelkhalek Torres (1961)
M'hamed Boucetta (1961-1963)
 Abdelkader Benjelloun (1963-1964)
 Abdelhadi Boutaleb (1964-1967)
Ali Benjelloun (1967-1968)
Driss Slaoui (1968)
Abdelhadi Boutaleb (1969-1971)
Ahmed Ben Bouchta (1971-1972)
Mohamed Bahnini (1972-1973)
Bachir Bel Abbes Taarji (1973-1974)
Abbes Kaissi (1974-1977)
 Mohamed Maati Bouabid (1977-1981)
 Moulay Mustapha Belarbi Alaoui (1981-1993)
 Mohammed Drissi Alami Machichi (1993-1995)
 Abderrahmane Amalou (1995-1997)
 Omar Azziman (1997-2002)
 Mohamed Bouzoubaâ (2002-2007)
 Abdelwahed Radi (2007-2010)
 Mohamed Taïb Naciri (2010-2012)
 Mustafa Ramid (2012-2017)
 Mohamed Auajjar (2017-2019)
 Mohamed Ben Abdelkader (2019-2021)
 Abdellatif Ouahbi (since 2021)

See also 

 Justice ministry
 Politics of Morocco

References 

Justice ministries
Government of Morocco